Erfjorden is a fjord in the municipalities Suldal and Hjelmeland in Rogaland county, Norway. The Erfjord Bridge crosses the fjord, just north of Hålandsosen. The innermost part of the fjord (north of the bridge) is sometimes referred to as the Tyssefjorden.

See also
 List of Norwegian fjords

References

Fjords of Rogaland
Suldal
Hjelmeland